A base anhydride is an oxide of a chemical element from group 1 or 2 (the alkali metals and alkaline earth metals, respectively). They are obtained by removing water from the corresponding hydroxide base. If water is added to a base anhydride, a corresponding hydroxide salt can be re-formed.

Base anhydrides are not Brønsted–Lowry bases because they are not proton acceptors. However, they are Lewis bases, because they will share an electron pair with some Lewis acids, most notably acidic oxides. They are potent alkalis and will produce alkali burns on skin, because their affinity for water (that is, their affinity for being slaked) makes them react with body water.

Examples 

 Quicklime (calcium oxide) is a base anhydride. It reacts with skin to become hydrated lime (calcium hydroxide), which is a strong base, chemically akin to lye.

See also 
 Acid anhydride
 Acidic oxide

References 

Acid–base chemistry